List of Italian football transfers summer 2008 may refer to:

 List of Italian football transfers summer 2008 (July)
 List of Italian football transfers summer 2008 (August)
 List of Italian football transfers summer 2008 (co-ownership)

2008
Italy